Born is a small lunar impact crater located near the eastern edge of the Moon, to the northeast of the prominent crater Langrenus. It was previously designated Maclaurin Y before being named by the IAU in 1979. Maclaurin itself lies to the north.

This crater is circular and generally cup-shaped, with dark patches stretching from the midpoint toward the northeastern rim. It is otherwise undistinguished.

References

 
 
 
 
 
 
 
 
 
 
 
 

Impact craters on the Moon
Max Born